Trustworthy AI is a programme of work of the ITU (United Nations Specialized Agency for ICT) under its AI for Good programme. The programme advances the standardization of a number of Privacy-enhancing technologies (PETs), including homomorphic encryption, federated learning, secure multi-party computation, differential privacy, zero-knowledge proof.

Privacy-Enhancing Technologies apply complex and sometimes counterintuitive operations to process signals and information while safeguarding privacy. For instance, homomorphic encryption allows for computing on encrypted data, where the outcomes or result is still encrypted and unknown to those performing the computation, but decryptable by the original encryptor. These technologies are often developed with the goal of enabling use in jurisdictions different from the data creation (under e.g. GDPR). As such, the programme being led by two international organizations develops international standards to operate in this context. The PETs are used from analytics such as Artificial Intelligence.

History 
The origin of the programme lies with the ITU-WHO Focus Group on Artificial Intelligence for Health, where strong need for privacy at the same time as the need for analytics, created a demand for a standard in these technologies.

When AI for Good moved online in 2020, the TrustworthyAI seminar series was initiated to start discussions on such work, which eventually led to the standardization activities.

Standardization

Multi-Party Computation 
 Secure Multi-Party Computation (MPC) is being standardizated under "Question 5" (the incubator) of ITU-T Study Group 17.

Homomorphic Encryption 
ITU has been collaborating since the early stage of the HomomorphicEncryption.org standardization meetings, which has developed a standard on Homomorphic encryption. The 5th homomorphic encryption meeting was hosted at ITU HQ in Geneva.

Federated Learning 
Zero-sum masks as used by federated learning for privacy preservation are used extensively in the multimedia standards of ITU-T Study Group 16 (VCEG) such as JPEG, MP3, and H.264, H.265 (aka MPEG).

Zero-knowledge proof 
Previous pre-standardization work on the topic of zero-knowledge proof has been conducted in the ITU-T Focus Group on Digital Ledger Technologies.

Differential privacy 
The application of differential privacy in the preservation of privacy was examined at several of the "Day 0" machine learning workshops at AI for Good Global Summits.

See also 
 Artificial Intelligence
 Privacy-enhancing technologies
 Data Science

References 

Information privacy
United Nations Economic and Social Council
International Telecommunication Union